S. paniculata may refer to:
 Saxifraga paniculata, a species of plant in the family Saxifragaceae
 Stephanomeria paniculata, a species of plant in the aster/daisy/sunflower family, Asteraceae
 Symmeria paniculata, a species of plant in the knotweed family, Polygonaceae 
 Stirlingia paniculata, a synonym for Stirlingia latifolia which is a species of plant in the family Proteaceae